Thomas Sven Moe (born February 17, 1970) is a former World Cup alpine ski racer from the United States. An Olympic gold and silver medalist in 1994, he specialized in the speed events of downhill and super G.

Early years
Born in Missoula, Montana, Moe learned to ski and race at The Big Mountain near Whitefish, where his father was a member of the ski patrol.  Moe refined his skills as a teenager in Alaska at Alyeska, near Anchorage, where he attended the Glacier Creek Ski Academy.  He joined the U.S. Ski Team in 1986 at age 16.

Racing career
Moe made his World Cup debut at 17 and days before he turned 19, competed at the 1989 World Championships in Vail, Colorado, where he placed 12th in the downhill competition. He earned his first World Cup points (top 15) in March 1990 with a 13th-place finish at Åre, Sweden, the 1990 season's final race.

In a surprising performance in 1994 Winter Olympics at Lillehammer, Norway, Moe became the first American male ski racer to win two medals in a single Winter Olympics, with a gold in the downhill and silver in the super-G at Kvitfjell. At the time Moe was a resident of Alaska; after his Olympic victories his father was shown on television waving the Alaska state flag.

Of Norwegian ancestry, he quickly became a favorite with the crowd at Kvitfjell, despite edging out Kjetil André Aamodt of Norway by 0.04 seconds to take the gold medal in the downhill. He then placed second in the super-G on his 24th birthday, finishing 0.09 seconds behind Markus Wasmeier of Germany. His success came despite not having yet won a World Cup race, though he had attained three podiums and had raced well the previous twelve months, starting with a fifth place in the downhill at the 1993 World Championships in Japan. (He won a month after the Olympics, a super-G at Whistler, Canada, his sole World Cup victory).

Moe's best World Cup season was also in 1994, where he finished third in the super-G and eighth in both the downhill and overall standings. (Since 1971, the World Cup standings have not included the Winter Olympics or World Championships results.)

In March 1995, Moe suffered a right knee injury at Kvitfjell, on the same race course on which he won his Olympic medals thirteen months earlier. Following his recovery, he never regained his top form, and missed the World Championships in 1997 after a fluke thumb injury in late January required surgery. He returned in March and won the downhill at the U.S. Alpine Championships in Maine. Moe made his third U.S. Olympic team in 1998 at Nagano, and finished eighth in the super-G and twelfth in the downhill at Hakuba. He retired from competitive ski racing that June at age 28.

Career highlights
1994 Winter Olympics in Lillehammer, Norway: two medals
Gold medal in Downhill
Silver medal in Super G (on his 24th birthday)
Five U.S. Alpine Championship titles
One World Cup victory (1994, Super G at Whistler)
Inducted into the National Ski Hall of Fame in 2003

World Cup results

Season standings

Race podiums
 1 win - (1 SG)
 7 podiums - (4 DH, 3 SG)

World Championship results

 The Super-G in 1993 was cancelled after multiple weather delays.

Olympic results

After racing
Moe was inducted into the National Ski Hall of Fame five years later, and is currently a co-owner of Tordrillo Mountain Lodge in the Alaska Range and lives in Wilson, Wyoming. He serves as an ambassador of skiing at nearby Jackson Hole Mountain Resort.

Personal
Moe married longtime girlfriend Megan Gerety in 2003; they have two daughters and reside in western Wyoming.

References

External links
 
 Tommy Moe World Cup standings at the International Ski Federation
 
 
 U.S. Ski and Snowboard Hall of Fame – Tommy Moe
 Jackson Hole.com – Tommy Moe
 Tordrillo Mountain Lodge – Tommy Moe
 Classic Mountain Zone.com – Tommy Moe – 1998 retirement

American male alpine skiers
Alpine skiers at the 1998 Winter Olympics
Alpine skiers at the 1994 Winter Olympics
Alpine skiers at the 1992 Winter Olympics
Sportspeople from Missoula, Montana
Sportspeople from Anchorage, Alaska
American people of Norwegian descent
1970 births
Living people
Medalists at the 1994 Winter Olympics
Olympic gold medalists for the United States in alpine skiing
Olympic silver medalists for the United States in alpine skiing
People from Wilson, Wyoming